Bell Biv DeVoe, also known as BBD, is an American music group from Boston, Massachusetts, formed from members of New Edition, consisting of Ricky Bell, Michael Bivins and Ronnie DeVoe.

The band is best known for their debut album, the multi-platinum selling Poison, a key work in the new jack swing movement of the 1990s that combined elements of traditional soul and R&B with hip hop.  Two singles from the album, "Poison" and "Do Me!", both reached number 3 on the Billboard Hot 100 in 1990.  The band released three more albums, though none had the success of their debut. Their most recent album Three Stripes came out in 2017.

Despite only producing four albums of original material in a 31-year span, the group has continuously toured and performed live, both as an act on their own and on several New Edition reunion tours.

History
The trio of Ricky Bell, Michael Bivins, and Ronnie DeVoe has their origins as founders of the Boston-based quintet New Edition, which had gained notice of famed producer Maurice Starr at a talent show in 1981, and as children had several hits with songs like "Candy Girl" and "Cool It Now". 

Throughout the 1980s, the line-up changed and the group matured and sought to branch out in new musical directions.  During a hiatus in 1989, and at the suggestion of producers Jimmy Jam & Terry Lewis, the three decided to form a new group, and were signed by MCA Records. With help from Public Enemy producers Eric Sadler, Hank and Keith Shocklee and several others, Bell Biv Devoe released its debut album Poison in 1990, an album credited as pioneering the "new jack swing" sound of the early 1990s, combining hip-hop, funk, soul, and pop music. This fusion of styles helped to expose them to a fan base which preferred a harder edged sound. Poison reached number 1 on Billboards R&B/Hip-Hop chart, and its title track, along with its second single, "Do Me!", both reached number 3 on Billboards Hot 100 chart. Shortly thereafter, Richard Wolf and Epic Mazur were responsible for the remix of "Do Me!" (which hit number six on the dance charts). Poison also spawned the singles  "B.B.D. (I Thought It Was Me)?", "When Will I See You Smile Again?" and "She's Dope!" Poison sold over four million copies, and was followed up by a remix album titled WBBD-Bootcity. 

Bell Biv DeVoe released Hootie Mack in 1993 on MCA Records, and the more hardcore rap/R&B influenced BBD in 2001 on Biv 10 Records. Neither album was as successful as Poison, though Hootie Mack did reach Gold success. Despite the fact that the group has only released four albums, the members of Bell Biv Devoe continue to perform together as a group. They also participated in several New Edition reunions, and continue to perform with them on tour as part of the group. On May 30, 2013, Bell Biv DeVoe performed their hit song "Poison" for Boston Strong, a benefit concert to raise money for victims of the Boston Marathon bombing.

In 2016, BBD released their first track in 15 years, "Run," along with an accompanying music video. It was the first single off the album Three Stripes, which was released January 27, 2017.

In 2023, they performed the national anthem with The Boston Pops Orchestra at the 2023 Winter Classic.

Awards and nominations
In 1991, the group received the award for Best R&B/Urban Contemporary Album of the Year, Group, Band or Duo for Poison at the Soul Train Music Awards.

The group also received an American Music Award for Favorite Soul/R&B Band/Duo/Group in 1992.

Discography

Studio albums

Remix album

Compilation album

Singles

Notes

 a As it was not issued as a retail single in the United States, "Word to the Mutha!" was not eligible to enter the Billboard Hot 100; however, it peaked at number 37 on the Hot 100 Airplay chart.
 b Re-issued and remixed in 1995, and therefore classed as a separate Top 10 hit
 cChart peak listed represent the Billboard Adult R&B Songs chart.

Music videos

References

External links
BBD-Music.com (Old official website)
BellBivDevoe.com (Future official website)

African-American musical groups
American boy bands
American contemporary R&B musical groups
American hip hop groups
New jack swing music groups

MCA Records artists
Universal Records artists
Musical groups from Boston
Musical groups established in 1989
Musical trios